Misch is a German surname. Notable people with the surname include:

 Carl E. Misch (1947–2017), American prosthodontist
 Georg Misch (1878–1965), German philosopher
 Laura Misch (born 1953)
 Marion Simon Misch (1869–1941)
 Pat Misch (born 1981)
 Rochus Misch (1917–2013), German Oberscharführer and bodyguard for Adolf Hitler
 Tom Misch, musician (born 1995)
Laura Misch, musician

Surnames
Surnames from given names
German-language surnames
Misch may also refer to Mischmetal.